Fudbalski klub Drina HE Višegrad (Serbian Cyrillic: Фудбалски клуб Дpинa XE Bишeгpaд) is a Bosnian Serb football club from the town of Višegrad, in Republika Srpska, Bosnia and Herzegovina.

The club competed for more than ten years in the First League of the Republika Srpska, finishing in an all-time high 5th place in the 2013-14 season. However, due to poor results Drina was relegated to the Second League of RS – East, a third-tier competition in Bosnia and Herzegovina.

Club seasons

Players

Current squad

External sources
 FK Drina HE Višegrad at FSRS

Association football clubs established in 1924
1924 establishments in Bosnia and Herzegovina
Football clubs in Republika Srpska
Football clubs in Bosnia and Herzegovina
Višegrad